Proctorus is a genus of true weevils in the beetle family Curculionidae. They are found in North America.

Species
These four species belong to the genus Proctorus:
 Proctorus armatus LeConte, 1876
 Proctorus decipiens (LeConte, 1876)
 Proctorus emarginatus Lewis & Anderson, 2022
 Proctorus truncatus Lewis & Anderson, 2022

References

Curculioninae
Articles created by Qbugbot